Celemony Software GmbH is a German musical software company that specializes in digital audio pitch correction software.  It produces Melodyne, a popular audio pitch modification tool similar to Auto-Tune, although the program itself is a manual tuning software.

History 
Celemony was founded in October 2000 by Peter Neubäcker, Prof. Dr. Hildegard Sourgens and Carsten Gehle. It is based in Munich, Germany.

In 2009, Melodyne won an MIPA Award for Most innovative product. In 2011, Celemony released Capstan, a stand-alone audio restoration software that eliminates wow and flutter from digital recordings.

In October 2011, Celemony and PreSonus introduced Audio Random Access (ARA), an extension for audio plug-in formats like AU and VST that permits to exchange data between them which is supported by several DAWs.

Melodyne 

Three years before Celemony was founded, Peter Neubäcker was working on a research experiment with sound. This experiment later turned into the Melodyne pitch correction product.

Melodyne has become a tool which is used by a large number of professional record producers worldwide to tune and manipulate audio signals, typically a singer's vocals.

Melodyne also has facilities for time-stretching, rebuilding melodies. It can also be used to aid the creation of backing vocals from an existing lead vocal. The first public viewing of Melodyne was at the Winter NAMM Show in 2001 and it has since won various awards.

As of May 2020, the current release is Melodyne 5. The most important new features of Version 5 relate to the correction of intonation on vocal tracks. The algorithm now detects the presence and extent of the unpitched (noise-like) components of the vocal sound as well as breaths, which it then processes separately from the pitched components. The volume balance between the pitched and unpitched components can be adjusted. New possibilities for dynamic contouring are afforded by the Fade Tool and the Leveling Macro, as they too work on a per-note basis, even with polyphonic audio material. With the Chord Track (and the Pitch Grid configured accordingly), recordings and samples can be adapted to the harmonic structure and chords of songs.

Artists who use the software include Herbie Hancock, Björk, Coldplay, Peter Gabriel and Thomas Newman. It is also used in classical music for the pitch analysis of speech. Composer Jonathan Harvey and IRCAM engineers used Melodyne to extract melodic material for his composition Speakings.

Direct Note Access 

Direct Note Access (DNA) allows independent manipulation of individual notes within chords and polyphonic recordings. Originally announced at Musikmesse Frankfurt 2008 to be released at the end of that year, it was later postponed to Q1 2009, then finally released on 16 November 2009 as part of Melodyne editor. On 14 January 2016, Celemony integrated DNA into their multitrack software Melodyne studio (version 4).

Grammy Award 
Celemony received a Special Merit/Technical Grammy Award at the 54th Grammy Awards in February 2012 for "contributions of outstanding technical significance to the recording field."

See also 
 Audio Random Access
 Audio time stretching and pitch scaling
 Dynamic tonality – the real-time changes of tuning and timbre for new chord progressions, musical temperament modulations, etc.
 Auto-Tune – a similar product

References

External links 
 
 Interview with Melodyne inventor Peter Neubäcker

Software companies of Germany
German brands
Pitch modification software
Software companies established in 2000
German companies established in 2000